Bajanzhargalanidae is an extinct family of rock crawlers in the order Grylloblattodea. There are at least four genera and about seven described species in Bajanzhargalanidae.

Genera
These four genera belong to the family Bajanzhargalanidae:
 † Bajanzhargalana Storozhenko, 1988
 † Nele Ansorge, 1996
 † Sinonele Cui, Béthoux, Klass & Ren, 2015
 † Sylvafossor Aristov, 2004

References

Grylloblattodea
Prehistoric insect families